CDR may refer to:

Technology
 Carbon dioxide removal, ways to remove carbon dioxide from the atmosphere
 Call detail record, a record of a (billing) event produced by a telecommunication network element
 Charging data record, a record of a (billing) event produced by a data network element in 3GPP networks
 China Digital Radio, a Chinese standard for digital radio broadcasting; competitor to DAB, HD Radio, DRM+
 Climate Data Record, a time series of measurements of sufficient length, consistency, and continuity to determine climate variability and change
 Committed data rate, in telecommunications, related to the committed information rate
 Crash Data Retrieval, a tool for imaging or downloading data from an Event data recorder

Computing
 CD-R, a recordable compact disc format
 Character Detection & Recognition, the detection and recognition of images with typed characters.
 CAR and CDR, in the programming language Lisp
 CDR coding, in the programming language Lisp
 CDR (file format), native to CorelDRAW
 .cdr, the file extension used for ISO 9660 disk images created by Disk Utility in Mac OS X
 Clock and data recovery, a method of synchronizing with serialized data received without a clock signal
 Common Data Representation, a format used to represent data types during remote invocations on Common Object Request Broker Architecture
 Content Disarm & Reconstruction, a computer security technology that removes malicious code from files by processing all incoming files of an enterprise network, deconstructing them, and removing the elements that do not match the file type's standards or set policies.
 Corporate Digital Responsibility, a set of rules compiled by a company that defines their ethical values when creating digital products.

Military
 Commander, a naval rank
 Commander (United States), a US naval military rank
 Commander, a NASA Astronaut designation for the commander of a mission
 Critical design review, a U.S. government design review in the engineering process

Organizations
 Center for the Development of Recycling, a recycling service organization at San Jose State University
 Center for Decision Research, a research group at the University of Chicago Graduate School of Business
 Coalition for the Defence of the Republic, a Rwandan political party involved in the 1994 Genocide
 Committees for the Defense of the Revolution, ("Comités de Defensa de la Revolución") in Cuba  
 Committees for the Defense of the Revolution ("Comités de Défense de la Révolution") in Burkina Faso
 Committee for the Defence of the Revolution (Ghana), see List of abbreviations in Ghana
 European Committee of the Regions, Comité des Régions, an EU organization
 Council on Disaster Reduction, of the American Society of Civil Engineers
 Council for Democratic Reform, a former military junta ruling Thailand
 Lebanese Council for Development and Reconstruction, organization founded to reconstruct Lebanon in 1977
 Romanian Democratic Convention, a former Romanian political alliance
 County Donegal Railway, a railway that was under the auspices of the County Donegal Railways Joint Committee
 Committees for the Defense of the Republic, local assemblies to defend the Catalan Republic

Science and medicine
 Clinical data repository, a medical database system designed to provide a realtime summary of a patient's condition
 Clinical Dementia Rating, a numeric scale used to quantify the severity of symptoms of dementia
 Cognitive dissonance reduction, a theory in psychology assuming that individuals seek consistency between their expectations and their reality.
 Complementarity-determining region, one of six hypervariable loops which determine the antigen specificity of a given antibody
 CDR computerized assessment system
 Challenge–dechallenge–rechallenge, a medical testing protocol
 Common Drug Review, a process for making drug formulary listing recommendations by the Canadian Agency for Drugs and Technologies in Health (CADTH)
 Crude death rate, a demographic measure of the mortality rate
 Cup-to-disc ratio, relation from cup to disc of the optic disc

Other uses
 Chadron Municipal Airport, an airport in United States
 Chris Douglas-Roberts, American basketball player
 Consumer Data Right, a framework for consumer data portability in Australia.

See also
 CCDR (disambiguation)